Cobalt: Cradle of the Demon Metals, Birth of a Mining Superpower is a 2022 book by Canadian politician Charlie Angus.

The non-fiction publication documents the mining history of Cobalt, Ontario and tensions between mining corporations and the population.

Publication 
Cobalt is written by Canadian New Democratic Party politician Charlie Angus. It is published by House of Anasi Press.

Synopsis 
Cobalt documents the events in Cobalt, Ontario around the turn of the 20th century, in particular the power and role of mining companies.

The book notes how prospecting rushes are told from the perspective of white settlers, despite the trade in metals by Indigenous peoples for two thousand years prior. It notes the theft of land from Indigenous peoples, the exploitation of workers and the environmental damage that occurred in early 20th-century Ontario, and subsequently on a global scale. The book notes how the federal Government of Canada was complicit in the abuses of land ownership that mining companies engaged in.

Critical reception 
Don Curry's review of the book in Bay Today described the book as "gripping", "hard hitting" and a "page turner". The book was shortlisted for the Legislative Assembly of Ontario's Speaker's Book Prize in 2022.

See also 

 Gold mining
 Mining in Canada
 List of gold mines in Canada

References 

2022 non-fiction books
Works about mining
History of gold mining
History of mining in Canada
House of Anansi Press books